Kvamsgavlen Cliff is a gable-like cliff facing east at the southeast corner of Storkvammen Cirque, on the east side of the Humboldt Mountains in Queen Maud Land, Antarctica. It was discovered and photographed by the Third German Antarctic Expedition, 1938–39, and was mapped and named by Norway from air photos and surveys by the Sixth Norwegian Antarctic Expedition, 1956–60.

References

Cliffs of Queen Maud Land
Humboldt Mountains (Antarctica)